Angel Gil (born 1951, Granada) is a Spanish professor at the University of Granada (UGR), Spain in the Department of Biochemistry and Molecular Biology. He is also the Honorary President of the Ibero-American Nutrition Foundation (FINUT).

Early life and education 
Gil was born in Granada, Spain in 1951. He earned his degree in Biology at the University of Granada, followed by his PhD in Biological Sciences from the same university.

Research and career 
The study of the function of dietary nucleotides in early life and the creation of baby nutrition products are just two of professor Gil's many research interests. Additionally, the design, development, and assessment of enteral clinical nutrition products, as well as the isolation, identification, and description of the mechanism of action of probiotics and the metabolic, molecular, and genetic factors involved in obesity and the early onset of the metabolic syndrome (MS) in childhood. Having about 50 years of professional experience, Gil is currently an Emeritus Professor at the University of Granada.

Awards and honors 
Gil has been honoured with many awards including the Class Fellow of the American Society of Nutrition (2022).

Patents 
Gil has obtained many patents for his inventions and his patents include Lipid Mixture and Use Thereof in the Preparation of a Product That Is Intended for Enteral or Oral Administration, Functional food supplement intended, in particular, for nutrition and for prevention and improvement in cases of neurological alterations, neurodegenerative alterations or cognitive disorders, Enteral or oral food product intended, in particular, for nutrition and for the prevention and improvement of neurological alterations, neurodegenerative alterations or cognitive disorders, Food product for enteral or oral nutrition, Protein mixture and use thereof in the preparation of a product that is intended for oral or enteral food, Food Product for Enteral or Oral Nutrition, Mixture Of Carboyhydrates And Its Use In The Preparation Of A Product Intended For Oral Or Enteral Nutrition, Nourishing products enriched with nucleosides and/or nucleotides for infants and adults and processes for their preparation, Fat Mixture For Child And Adult Nutrition, Isolation, identification and characterization of strains with probiotic activity, from faeces of infants fed exclusively with breast milk.

Publications 
 A Stephen, M Alles, C De Graaf, M Fleith, E Hadjilucas, E Isaacs, C Maffeis, G Zeinstra, Christophe Matthys, A Gil. "The role and requirements of digestible dietary carbohydrates in infants and toddlers". 
 Ricardo Uauy, Richard Quan, Angel Gil. "Role of nucleotides in intestinal development and repair: implications for infant nutrition".
 N Nieto, MI Torres, MI Fernandez, MD Giron, A Rios, MD Suarez, A Gil. "Experimental ulcerative colitis impairs antioxidant defence system in rat intestine".
 Angel Gil, Rosa M Ortega, José Maldonado. "Wholegrain cereals and bread: a duet of the Mediterranean diet for the prevention of chronic diseases". Public health nutrition.
 Angel Gil, Fernando Gil. "Fish, a Mediterranean source of n-3 PUFA: benefits do not justify limiting consumption".

References

External links 
 Angel Gil on Google Scholar

Living people
1951 births
Spanish scientists
Spanish biochemists
Spanish molecular biologists